Mark Thomas (April 24, 1931 – January 24, 2022) was an American flutist and music educator who studied under William Kincaid. Thomas was also the founder and honorary president of the National Flute Association.

Early life and education 
Thomas was born in Lakeland, Florida. He earned a bachelor's degree in flute performance from the Peabody Institute in 1949. After graduating, Thomas enlisted in the United States Army. He was a member of the United States Army Band until 1958.

Career 
In 1972, Thomas, along with several other flutists, founded the National Flute Association in Anaheim, California. In 2005, Thomas received the National Flute Association's Distinguished Service Award for his work in founding and helping it develop into an international organization. Thomas has performed at the White House for four presidents and has served on the faculty of American University, the University of North Carolina at Charlotte, the University of Notre Dame, and George Washington University.

Personal life 
Thomas died in Charlotte, North Carolina, on January 24, 2022.

Selected Discography 

  Sounds of Gold  (with Christine Croshaw) (Golden Crest Records, 1980)
  Images  (with Christine Croshaw) (Golden Crest Records, 1982)
  Contrasts  (with Christine Croshaw) (Golden Crest Records, 1983)

References

External links 
Mark Thomas – National Flute Association 2005 National Service Award
Mark Thomas Flutist website
Mark Thomas Interview NAMM Oral History Library (2013)

American flautists
1931 births
2022 deaths
People from Lakeland, Florida
Peabody Institute alumni
United States Army Band musicians
Classical musicians from Florida
American University faculty and staff
University of North Carolina at Charlotte faculty
University of Notre Dame faculty
George Washington University faculty
20th-century American musicians
20th-century American male musicians
20th-century classical musicians
21st-century American musicians
21st-century American male musicians
21st-century classical musicians
20th-century flautists
21st-century flautists